Bihari Lal Rallia Ram was an anti-colonial politician associated with the Indian National Congress and the founding secretary of All India Conference of Indian Christians. After partition, Ram stayed in Pakistan and launched the All Pakistan Christian League. In April 1950, he was inducted as a representative of Punjab in the Constituent Assembly of Pakistan.

Ram was a graduate from University of Lahore, and a staunch adherent of Gandhi. In British India, he was involved with several Christian organizations — as National General Secretary of the YMCA of India, Burma and Ceylon, and Secretary of the Punjab Indian Christian Association. From 1940 to 1945, Ram served as an honorary treasurer of the Indian Olympic Association.

Notes

References 

Date of birth missing
Date of death missing
Indian National Congress politicians
Politicians from Punjab, Pakistan
Members of the Constituent Assembly of Pakistan